Fritz Huhn (26 September 1900 – 10 June 1990) was a German athlete. He competed in the men's high jump at the 1928 Summer Olympics.

References

1900 births
1990 deaths
Athletes (track and field) at the 1928 Summer Olympics
German male high jumpers
Olympic athletes of Germany
Place of birth missing